Field Marshal Mateo de Toro Zambrano y Ureta (September 20, 1727 – February 26, 1811), frequently misnamed Mateo de Toro y Zambrano in many Chilean history publications, was Viscount of La Descubierta and later Count of La Conquista (1771) and Knight of the Spanish Order of Santiago.  He was a Chilean creole and had a career as a soldier under the Spanish Empire after he amassed a fortune in commerce.  

In 1810, as the most senior military figure in the Captaincy General of Chile, as well as its Royal Governor, he called a meeting of leading citizens on September 18, 1810.  This group would subsequently elect the governing junta similar to those appearing throughout the rebelling Spanish colonies, an action which is generally seen as the first step in Chilean independence process.  He was voted the President of this First Government Junta, but his death a year later (he was already 83 years old) precluded him from taking a larger role in the independence of Chile. He died in Santiago de Chile on February 26, 1811.

See also
Count of la Conquista

References

1727 births
1811 deaths
People from Santiago
Chilean people of Basque descent
Royal Governors of Chile
Heads of state of Chile
Mateo 01
Knights of Santiago
Spanish generals
People of the Chilean War of Independence